"I Can't Stop This Feeling I've Got" is a song by the English indie rock band Razorlight, and is the sixth track on their 2006 second album, Razorlight. The song was released 19 March 2007 as the fourth single from that album in the United Kingdom, peaking at #44 in the UK Singles Chart.

The song was the first single from the album to fail to enter the top 40 of the UK Singles Chart. Following its #44 debut, it fell to #59 in its second week and dropped out of the top 75 altogether in its third week.

Track listings
CD 6 02517 24345 3
 "I Can't Stop This Feeling I've Got"
 "When Doves Cry"
 A cover of the 1984 Prince song.
 "These Days"
 A cover of the Jackson Browne song.
 Released on the CD version of the single only.

2007 singles
Razorlight songs
Song recordings produced by Chris Thomas (record producer)
Songs written by Johnny Borrell
Songs written by Björn Ågren
2006 songs
Vertigo Records singles
Mercury Records singles